Sancho was an unincorporated community in Tyler County, West Virginia, United States. Its post office  is closed.

The community most likely was named after nearby Sanch Creek.

References 

Unincorporated communities in West Virginia
Unincorporated communities in Tyler County, West Virginia